The Instituto Geológico Minero y Metalúrgico (INGEMMET) is a Peruvian scientific and management agency part of the Ministry of Energy and Mines. It is devoted to the study of the mineral resources, geology of Peru and the regulation of mineral rights in that country.

Volcano surveillance 
Observatorio Vulcanológico INGEMMET (OVI) is the division of INGEMMET in charge of the study of volcanic activity and potential hazards due to that activity.

References

External links 

 Official INGEMMET site (in Spanish).
 INGEMMET on Twitter (in Spanish).
INGEMMET Volcano Surveillance (in Spanish) .

Government agencies of Peru
Geological surveys
Earth sciences organizations